Tolani Asuni, (January 6, 1924 – June 21, 2011) was a Nigerian medical doctor and psychiatrist. Asuni was one of the first indigenous psychiatrists in Nigeria and is credited with promoting mental health in Africa. He was educated in Nigeria and the west and returned to Nigeria for his professional life. Asuni became the foundation professor of psychiatry at University College Hospital Ibadan where he worked from 1957–1976 as the Medical Superintendent of Aro Medical Hospital. From 1979 to 1984 he was the Director of the United Nations Social Defence Research Institute in Rome, Italy. Asuni was a suicidologist and forensic psychiatrist. His 1975 textbook, Mental Health and Disease in Africa, was used for many years by undergraduates and graduate students of mental health. Asuni helped to improve global understandings of mental health in Africa and abroad and promoted the universality of mental health conditions.

Early life 
Tolani Asuni was born in Lagos, Nigeria to Suwe and T.M. Asuni, both business people in Nigeria. His was a Muslim trading family in the Yoruba tradition and because of his mother's business travels, his paternal grandmother also had a significant influence on his life. Asuni attended both Olowogobo Methodist School and Baptist Academy, and began at Igbobi College.

Education 
Asuni spent time beginning at age 18 working for the Department of the Treasury as an Audit Clerk (Third Class) and with the Department of Posts and Telegraphs he served as a Sub-inspector (Grade III). In hopes of studying medicine, he shifted to the University of Dublin School of Medicine which he completed in 1952. When he returned to Nigeria, a chance meeting with Adeoye Lambo in 1956 changed the course of his professional pursuits and he went back to school for psychiatry in London at the Institute of Psychiatry (1957-1960).

Career 
Throughout his career, Asuni was actively involved in the international psychological community by producing knowledge and sharing that knowledge worldwide. He helped improve global understandings about mental health in Africa. After returning to Nigeria, Asuni replaced Adeoye Lambo as medical superintendent at the University College Hospital Ibadan. During his time there, Asuni developed a teaching center for students at the college. He was known as a positive mentor to the psychiatric students. While in Ibadan (1957–1976), he further developed Adeoye Lambo's community care system for mental health patients and during Asuni's tenure the care center became a World Health Organization center. Following his time in Ibadan, Asuni then became the Director of the United Nations Social Defence Research Institute (1979–1984) in Rome where, among other things, he was involved with the research and prevention of illegal artifact trading and drug trafficking. He was Chief Examiner at the Faculty of Psychiatry at the West African College of Physicians and chairman of the Psychiatric Hospitals Management Board. His work on mental health included seeking to reduce the stigma surrounding suicide and the rehabilitation of the mentally ill homeless.

Research 
Asuni focused his research interests on mental health, specifically suicide, drug use, and the cultural vs. universal nature of mental health conditions. He studied suicide in Nigeria as it compared to other parts of the world. In his work, he sought to discover whether mental health conditions were driven by regional culture or if the conditions were universal across the globe. Asuni also studied the introduction, causes, and acception of cannabis in Nigeria.

He also studied the effects of repatriation on mental health. In 1961-64, Asuni studied 82 mentally ill students who had repatriated to Nigeria. His findings reported that repatriation rarely helps the mentally ill patient.

Theory 
Asuni Tulani was a transcultural psychiatrist who argued that non-Westerners suffered from the same types of mental illnesses, such as schizophrenia, depression, and anxiety, that westerners do. Asuni rejected the notion of the "African mind" as different from minds of those in the west. An example of this rejection is the study on Brain Fag Syndrome where some psychiatrists felt Nigerians were unique, but he did not. In the end, Asuni was proven correct as Brain Fag Syndrome was found among people in many parts of the world.

Asuni embraced western and traditional Nigerian healing practices, but found western techniques to be more effective. Where Lambo suggested the "traditional" Yoruba healers' work was equally effective, Asuni disagreed. He recognized the usefulness of the healer's art, but looked for more than anecdotal reports for evidence of its efficacy. Asuni felt both could be used concurrently, but saw challenges with putting into practice both western and traditional techniques side-by-side. He strove to explain traditional healing in western terms such as psychoanalytical and psychotherapeutic theories.

Works

Books 

 Book Chapter. "The drug abuse scene in Nigeria." In The International Challenge of Drug Abuse.
 Book Chapter. "University education of Criminology in Africa." In Eguzkilore.
 Modern Medicine and traditional medicine
 Book Chapter. "Psychiatry – Partner in the Administration of Justice." In Psychiatry by P. Pinchot, P. Berner, R. Wolf, K. Thau, eds.
 Colonial psychiatry and  "the African mind."

Articles 

 Suicide in Western Nigeria
 The dilemma of traditional healing with special reference to Nigeria
 Drug abuse in Africa
 Mental health and disease in Africa: with special reference to Africa south of the Sahara, with C. R. Swift.
 Aro hospital in perspective
 Impact of research on designing strategies for preventing and treating dependence on drugs: The case for developing countries–especially African countries
 Nigeria: Report on the care, treatment and rehabilitation of people with mental illness.
 Preliminary study of juvenile delinquency in western Nigeria
 Mental Health Promotion through Psychosocial Rehabilitation, with M. Gittelman, with J. Dubuis, V. Nagaswami, I.R.H. Falloon & L. Publico.
 Community Development and Public Health By-Product of Social Psychiatry in Nigeria.
 Therapeutic communities of the hospital and villages in Aro Hospital Complex in Nigeria 
 Sociocultural and Economic Determinants of Rehabilitation
 The Nyctohemeral Rhythm of Plasma Cortisol in Mental Illness in Nigerians, with B. Kwaku Adadevoh.
 Socio-medical problems of religious converts
 Towards the Success of Intercultural Marriage: A Nigerian Example, with Judith Asuni.
 Treatment of depression.
 Social Network and Traditional Support Systems for Victims.

Reports 

 Socio-psychiatric problems of cannabis in Nigeria

References 

Nigerian psychiatrists
2011 deaths